Lloydminster Meridians was a baseball team in Lloydminster, Alberta, Canada that played along with the Edmonton Eskimos and the Edmonton Drakes.

References

Baseball teams in Alberta
Defunct minor league baseball teams
Sport in Lloydminster
Defunct baseball teams in Canada